Hibiscus tiliaceus, commonly known as the sea hibiscus or coast cottonwood, is a species of flowering tree in the mallow family, Malvaceae, with a pantropical distribution along coastlines. It has also been introduced to Florida and New Zealand. It has been debated whether this species is native or introduced to Hawaii.

Names 
Common names include sea hibiscus, beach hibiscus, coastal (or coast) hibiscus, coastal (or coast) cottonwood, green cottonwood, native hibiscus, native rosella, cottonwood hibiscus, kurrajong, sea rosemallow and dhigga (Maldivian).

The plant was introduced by Austronesian peoples that voyaged across Southeast Asia and Oceania as a source of wood and fibre. This is reflected in the names of the plant as spoken in many related languages spoken in those regions including  balibago (Tagalog), 
malobago (Bikol), malabago or malbago (Cebuano – Southern), maribago (Cebuano – Northern), lambago (Cebuano - Cagayan de Oro), waru (Javanese), baru or bebaru (Malay), pagu (Chamorro), hau (Hawaiian),  fau (Samoan), purau (Tahitian), and vau tree. The specific epithet, "tiliaceus", refers to its resemblance of the leaves to those of the related Tilia species.

Distribution and habitat

Hibiscus tiliaceus has a worldwide tropical distribution. In the Old World and Oceania, it is a common coastal plant in most of tropical Africa, South Asia (including the Maldives), Southeast Asia, parts of East Asia (as far north as central Japan, where it reaches its northernmost extent), eastern and northern Australia, and much of the Pacific Islands, including Hawaii (where its establishment status is uncertain). It has also been introduced to New Zealand. A separate variety, var. pernambucensis (formerly considered a separate species, H. pernambucensis), is native to the tropical New World, including Mexico, Central America, the Caribbean, and much of South America. This variety has also been introduced to Florida. 

It is uncertain if the species is native to Hawaii, as it may have been introduced by the Polynesians. It is considered native by Plants of the World Online, but the IUCN considers it of uncertain status. It is commonly found growing on beaches, by rivers and in mangrove swamps. Sea hibiscus is well adapted to grow in coastal environment in that it tolerates salt and waterlogging and can grow in quartz sand, coral sand, marl, limestone, and crushed basalt. It grows best in slightly acidic to alkaline soils (pH of 5–8.5).
Cotton Tree, Queensland, Australia is named for the plant.

Description
The flowers of H. tiliaceus are bright yellow with a deep red center upon opening. Over the course of the day, the flowers deepen to orange and finally red before they fall. The branches of the tree often curve over time. The leaves are heart shaped and deep red in the var. rubra.

Uses

The wood of H. tiliaceus has a specific gravity of 0.6. It has been used in a variety of applications, such as seacraft construction, firewood, and wood carvings. It is easy to plane and turns well, so it is regarded by many as a high quality furniture wood. Plant fibers taken from the stems have traditionally been used in rope making, while its bark has been used like cork, in sealing cracks in boats. The bark and roots may be boiled to make a cooling tea to cool fevers, and its young leafy shoots may be eaten as vegetables. Native Hawaiians used the wood to make iako (spars) for waa (outrigger canoes), mouo (fishing net floats), and au koi (adze handles). Kaula ilihau (cordage) was made from the bast fibers.  Hau would be used to make ama (canoe floats) if the preferred wiliwili (Erythrina sandwicensis) was unavailable.

Hibiscus tiliaceus is widely used in Asian countries as a subject for the art of bonsai, especially Taiwan. The finest specimens are taken from Kenting National Park. Lending itself to free grafting, the leaf size is reduced fairly quickly.  Its leaves are also used in cooking, as trays for steamed rice cakes (粿).

In Indonesia H. tiliaceus is also used for fermenting tempeh. The undersides of the leaves are covered in downy hairs known technically as trichomes to which the mold Rhizopus oligosporus can be found adhering in the wild. Soybeans are pressed into the leaf, and stored. Fermentation occurs resulting in tempeh.

Chemistry
Cyanidin-3-glucoside is the major anthocyanin found in flowers of H. tiliaceus. Leaves of H. tiliaceus displayed strong free radical scavenging activity and the highest tyrosinase inhibition activity among 39 tropical plant species in Okinawa. With greater UV radiation in coastal areas, it is possible that leaves and flowers of natural coastal populations of H. tiliaceus have stronger antioxidant properties than planted inland populations.

See also
Domesticated plants and animals of Austronesia
Thespesia populnea

References

Bibliography

Masuda, T., Yonemori, S., Oyama, Y., Takeda, Y., Tanaka, T., Andoh, T., Shinohara, A., Nakata, M. (1999). ”Evaluation of the antioxidant activity of environmental plants: activity of the leaf extracts from seashore plants”. Journal of Agricultural and Food Chemistry 47: 1749–1754.
Masuda, T., Yamashita, D., Takeda, Y., Yonemori, S. (2005). “Screening for tyrosinase inhibitors among extracts of seashore plants and identification of potent inhibitors from Garcinia subelliptica”. Bioscience, Biotechnology, and Biochemistry 69: 197–201.
Wong, S.K., Lim, Y.Y., Chan, E.W.C. (2009). “Antioxidant properties of Hibiscus: Species variation, altitudinal change, coastal influence and floral colour change”. Journal of Tropical Forest Science 21(4): 307–315. 
Wong, S.K., Chan, E.W.C. (2010). “Antioxidant properties coastal and inland populations of Hibiscus tiliaceus”. ISME/GLOMIS Electronic Journal 8(1): 1–2. http://www.glomis.com/ej/pdf/EJ_8-1.pdf.

tiliaceus
Flora of Norfolk Island
Malvales of Australia
Flora of Queensland
Flora of the Maldives
Trees of Australia
Trees of the Philippines
Trees of the Pacific
Flora of Christmas Island
Plants described in 1753
Taxa named by Carl Linnaeus